or) was a Japanese retail group, founded in 1930 by  and his wife . Initially a single shop, it was expanded by their son Kazuo Wada into a major supermarket chain with most retail outlets located in Shizuoka prefecture, south of Tokyo. It was incorporated in 1948 and listed on Tokyo Stock Exchange. The store was far more established and notable outside Japan, due to restrictive laws in Japan that made it difficult to set up new businesses, such that by the time it opened its first store in the Tokyo metropolitan area, the company was already in a state of decline due to accumulated debts from over-expansion.

Growth

 During the 1980s and 1990s, the Yaohan group expanded dramatically outside Japan, especially into Hong Kong (since 1984), China (since 1995) and the US. At its peak, it had 450 outlets in 16 countries, including 9 in Hong Kong, as well in São Paulo, Sorocaba (inside highway bus depot), San José, Costa Rica, Los Angeles, Vancouver (Yaohan Centre), Honolulu, London, and San Jose, California. Yaohan's first American location, at Fresno, California, was opened in 1979 at Yaohan Plaza.

Typical of large Japanese companies, new employees were required to go through induction training programs that, in the case of Yaohan, had a strong religious emphasis on the principles of Seicho-no-Ie. Employees also had to go through regular seminars on Seicho-no-Ie and were ultimately required to be members of Seicho-no-Ie. This was not without resistance from its employees. Although the company was less strict on seminar attendance and membership for employees of overseas branches, the same resistance persisted.

Hong Kong
The first Yaohan store was opened in New Town Plaza, Sha Tin, Hong Kong in 1984. After that, Yaohan store grew quickly in Hong Kong and had opened nine stores, which include Tuen Mun Town Plaza, Whampoa Garden, Yuen Long, Ma On Shan, Tsuen Wan. All the stores were closed in 1997 due to the financial turmoil and the burst of the Japanese economy bubble. Then many stores were replaced by another Japanese department store chain, JUSCO (now called AEON).

Yaohan is one of the listed companies in Hong Kong during 1986 to 1997. It has owned many companies, such as the Wonderful World of Whimsy, Millie, Santa Ana Bakery and some another fast-food restaurant. But many of them were closed later.

Macau
Yaohan store was established and opened in 1992 in Macau. It is the first and the only department store in Macau until now. It was renamed as New Yaohan after the bankruptcy of the original company, and the new company is operated by Yaohan International Company Limited.

Malaysia
The first Yaohan store was opened in The Mall, Kuala Lumpur in 1987. It was later followed by Centre Point, Kota Kinabalu, Plaza OUG at Taman OUG in Jalan Klang Lama, and KOMTAR, Penang. Later it opened in Terminal 1, Seremban in 1996 and Sunway Pyramid, Subang Jaya in September 1997. All former stores were replaced by Aktif Lifestyle Corporation Bhd. in January 1998 and later Parkson in 2004.

Singapore
Its first store to open in Singapore in 1974 at Plaza Singapura revolutionised the grocery shopping experience in Singapore, and it quickly became a household name. Other stores were also opened in Thomson Plaza (1979), Bukit Timah (1982), Jurong (1983), and Parkway Parade (1983). The Jurong store was closed in 1989, and a new store planned at the IMM Shopping Mall was due to open in 1990. The sixth store was supposed to open in Kovan Shopping Centre in 1993. When the last store to cease operations in 1997 exited Singapore from Thomson Plaza, its staff were visibly moved and some were in tears. Also in operation in Singapore since 1985 was the Yaohan Best chain (a joint venture with Best Denki), specializing in electronics, which first opened in Yaohan's store space.

Thailand
The first Yaohan store was opened in Thailand at Fortune Town, Ratchadaphisek Road, Bangkok in 1991 following by Future Park Bang Khae in 1994. Withdrew during the year 1997 following financial crisis.

Indonesia
In 1992, Yaohan opened its first branch in Indonesia at Plaza Atrium, a shopping center in the Segitiga Senen superblock, Central Jakarta. Opening on 21 August 1992, the 3-storey store was 100% managed and owned by PT. Suryaraya Mantap Utama, being supported with a US$10 million investment from Yaohan International Company Limited, which also licensed branding, distribution, and basic training. After the Plaza Atrium branch, there were plans to open a second branch in Mal Kelapa Gading 2, although it was instead replaced with a Sogo. This outlet closed in early 1995, due to its inconspicuous location being unattractive for its target customers, resulting in rapid loss. It has since been replaced by Matahari, a local department store chain. A few unrelated supermarkets under the name Macan Yaohan also opened since 1985 in Medan, although all locations had since closed in 2015.

Decline

When the company faced financial difficulties, it was split into two companies, one in Japan and with the overseas part headquartered in Hong Kong, in a bid to survive. The group was traded on the Hong Kong Stock Exchange as Yaohan International Company Limited until 11 August 1998. Through a combination of the 1997 Asian financial crisis and the stagnation of the Japanese retail market, however, the group declared bankruptcy with 161 billion yen of debts. It was the biggest postwar failure in Japan's retail sector at the time. The super-market chain asked for protection from creditors under Japan's Corporate Rehabilitation Law on 18 September 1997. Many outlets were closed.

In March 2000, Yaohan in Japan was bought by ÆON Group and changed its name to Maxvalu Tokai; most of the stores in Hong Kong were also overtaken by ÆON and became JUSCO. Other stores in the US were bought by Maruwa, Mitsuwa, and Marukai, the latter two based in Los Angeles. Stores in Canada were bought by The President Group, a Taiwanese company.

A former Yaohan department store in Macau is operating under the trading name New Yaohan (新八佰伴), operated by Yaohan International Company Limited in Hong Kong which is owned by STDM (controlled by Stanley Ho) and no longer has a connection with the Wada family. Yaohan Best has been renamed as Best Denki.

See also
Economy of Japan

References

External links
   (Archive)
Defunct companies of Hong Kong
Companies that have filed for bankruptcy in Japan
Supermarkets of Japan
Multinational companies headquartered in Hong Kong
Retail companies established in 1930
Retail companies of Hong Kong
Retail companies disestablished in 2000
Companies formerly listed on the Tokyo Stock Exchange
Japanese companies disestablished in 2000
Japanese companies established in 1930